DK: King of Swing is a 2005 puzzle-platform game developed by Paon and published by Nintendo for the Game Boy Advance. King of Swing diverges from the gameplay of other games in the Donkey Kong series, instead featuring characters rotating around pegs to progress similar to the NES game Clu Clu Land. King of Swing has a single-player adventure mode, as well as a competitive multiplayer mode for up to four players. The game received mixed reception.

A sequel, DK: Jungle Climber, was released for the Nintendo DS in 2007.

DK: King of Swing was re-released for the Wii U's Virtual Console in Japan and North America in November 2014 and in Europe and Australia in January 2015.

Gameplay

In DK: King of Swing, gameplay is primarily based around the use of the L and R triggers, which control the player character's left and right hands respectively. By holding the trigger, the character's fist will clamp shut, grasping anything in its range. Pegs and pegboards are positioned throughout the environment for characters to grasp, allowing the player to climb and traverse their surroundings. Grasping a peg with the character's right or left hand will respectively cause them to rotate clockwise or counterclockwise around it, and the player must use their spinning momentum to propel them through the air. Both the triggers and the D-pad can be used to affect horizontal character movement while airborne or on the ground. Pressing both triggers simultaneously while grounded will cause the character to jump, while holding the triggers at any time will cause them to store up power, after which they will perform a charge attack when the triggers are released. This can be used to attack enemies and obstacles or cross short gaps. Players can also perform other tasks with their character's hands in combination with their spinning momentum, such as turning cranks, pulling levers, and throwing rocks at distant enemies.

In the game's single-player Adventure mode, King K. Rool steals the prize medals from the upcoming Jungle Jam tournament, prompting Donkey Kong to chase after him and retrieve the stolen medals. Players control Donkey Kong as he travels across five worlds, each made up of four stages and a boss battle. Scattered across each stage are bananas for Donkey Kong to collect, which the player can spend at any time during gameplay to recover Donkey Kong's health or grant him temporary invincibility. Players can find one of 20 Crystal Coconuts hidden in each stage, which are used to unlock bonus content. A stolen medal can also be found in nearly every stage, as well as earned from defeating each boss. Completing the game with all 24 medals collected will unlock "Diddy Mode", a more difficult version of Adventure where the player controls Diddy Kong. A time attack mode for the Adventure stages can also be unlocked.

In Jungle Jam mode, the player can participate in four-player competitive events against computer-controlled opponents or up to three other players via the use of a Game Link Cable. There are five types of Jungle Jam events: two based around racing, two based around battling, and one based around capturing territory on a board. Players are awarded bronze, silver, or gold medals for defeating CPU opponents in single-player events, with additional events unlocked as the player earns medals in Adventure. Donkey Kong, Diddy Kong, Dixie Kong and Funky Kong all appear as playable characters in Jungle Jam by default; by obtaining collectibles in Adventure and gold medals in Jungle Jam, players can also unlock Wrinkly Kong, Kremling, King K. Rool, and Bubbles from Clu Clu Land.

Reception

DK: King of Swing has received mixed reception, garnering an aggregate score of 71.85% on GameRankings based on 39 reviews. IGN gave the game a score of 7.8 out of 10, criticizing the cartoon-style graphics as being a big step back from the pre-rendered 3D rendered graphics featured in the Donkey Kong Country series. However, they considered DK: King of Swing as an example of a Nintendo game attempting something that's both unique and familiar at the same time.

Legacy
A sequel to DK: King of Swing, titled DK: Jungle Climber, was released in 2007 for the Nintendo DS. It received favorable reviews and was generally considered an improvement over King of Swing.

Notes

References

2005 video games
Donkey Kong video games
Game Boy Advance games
Multiplayer and single-player video games
Puzzle-platform games
Video games developed in Japan
Virtual Console games
Virtual Console games for Wii U
Yeti in fiction